Wei Ren is a professor in Electrical and Computer Engineering at the University of California, Riverside. He was named a Fellow of the Institute of Electrical and Electronics Engineers (IEEE) in 2016 for his contributions to distributed coordination and control of multi-agent systems.

References

Fellow Members of the IEEE
Living people
Year of birth missing (living people)
Place of birth missing (living people)
American electrical engineers